Canada's Drag Race  is a Canadian reality competition television series based on the American series RuPaul's Drag Race and is the Canadian edition of the Drag Race franchise, produced by Blue Ant Studios. In a similar format to the American version, the show features a crop of Canadian drag queens as they compete for a grand prize of $100,000 and the title of "Canada's Next Drag Superstar". The series airs on Crave in Canada, the United Kingdom's BBC Three, and worldwide on WOW Presents Plus.

It was the fourth international version of the Drag Race franchise to be announced, following Drag Race Thailand, The Switch Drag Race (Chile) and RuPaul's Drag Race UK; two months after the announcement of the Canadian version, RuPaul's Drag Race Down Under was also announced. Canada's Drag Race was the first English-language iteration of Drag Race to not be hosted by RuPaul, although RuPaul does appear in video messages to the contestants, and narrates the title sequence. The series is hosted by RuPaul's Drag Race season 11 runner-up Brooke Lynn Hytes, along with judges Brad Goreski and Traci Melchor. Past judges include Amanda Brugel, Jeffrey Bowyer-Chapman, and Stacey McKenzie. 

The first episode of the first season premiered on July 2, 2020. The cast was announced on May 14, 2020. A third season was announced on November 10, 2021 and premiered on July 14, 2022.

The series has been critically acclaimed and has won 12 Canadian Screen Awards.

Production

Season 1

Casting occurred in mid-2019 with production starting in fall 2019. The inaugural season consisted of ten one-hour episodes. In June 2020 it was announced that the series would be carried by BBC Three in the United Kingdom. Early coverage of the production announcement indicated that the series would also air on OutTV; although that channel did not simulcast the series in first run, it was later announced on December 3 that there would be a marathon of the series on December 5, along with all episodes being available for streaming as of December 3, on OutTV's subscription service, OutTV Go.

In the United States the series premiered on WOW Presents Plus, the streaming service of RuPaul's Drag Race production company World of Wonder, concurrently with its Canadian debut. It was subsequently added to the schedule of Logo TV, premiering on that service on July 27, 2020.

In August 2021, it was announced that the Season 1 queens would be featured in a Canada's Drag Race Anniversary Extravaganza reunion special, airing on Crave September 6, 2021 in advance of the second season launch. The special included the premiere of a new music video from Priyanka's Taste Test EP, as well as an introduction to the second season judging panel.

Season 2

In January 2021, it was announced that the show was renewed for a second season. At the same time, it was announced that comedian and producer Trevor Boris will join production as showrunner in the second season.

In March 2021, it was announced that Bowyer-Chapman will not return as a judge in the second season, due to a scheduling conflict with another project he is working on. In June 2021, it was announced that McKenzie will not return as a judge in the second season, due to travel restrictions related to the COVID-19 pandemic. The second season judging panel included fashion stylist Brad Goreski, actress Amanda Brugel, and broadcaster and Season 1 "Squirrel Friend" Traci Melchor.

Season 3
For the third season, the judges panel was re-worked again, consisting of only Hytes, Goreski, and Melchor.

Season 4
A fourth season was announced in November 2022, expected to air in 2023.

Judges

On September 26, 2019, it was announced that the judging panel for the first season would include RuPaul's Drag Race season 11 runner-up Brooke Lynn Hytes, actor Jeffrey Bowyer-Chapman and fashion model Stacey McKenzie. Bell Media personality Traci Melchor appears as a recurring cast member, with the title "Canada's Squirrel Friend"; her role in the first season entailed participatory support in challenges, including co-judging the Canada Gay-M mini-challenge, hosting a sheTalk red carpet segment prior to Snatch Game, and serving as one of the judges of the Miss Loose Jaw pageant. Melchor also guest hosted the season finale. Hytes was the first prior competitor in the RuPaul's Drag Race franchise to appear on the judge's panel on any edition of the show.

In March 2021 Hytes and McKenzie announced they would be returning for the show's second season while Bowyer-Chapman would not, citing scheduling issues, writing that "unfortunately, with scheduling, things just didn't work out for him to come back this season... he'll be so missed". On June 28, 2021, a tweet from the show's official Twitter account confirmed that, contrary to the previous announcement, McKenzie would not be returning either, blaming "COVID-related challenges" that meant she was unable to travel to Canada to film the season. The following day on June 29, 2021, celebrity stylist Brad Goreski and actress and season one guest host Amanda Brugel were announced to be joining the panel to replace Bowyer-Chapman and McKenzie, with "Canada's Squirrel Friend" Melchor also becoming a judge and alternating weekly with Brugel. Hytes, Goreski and Melchor returned as judges for the third season.

Contestants 

There have been a total of 36 contestants featured on Canada's Drag Race.

Series overview

Post-production

Drag Ball and Drag Superstars
Separately from the production of the series, all of the queens from the season participated in Pride events for both Pride Toronto and Fierté Montreal, presented as online streaming specials due to the COVID-19 pandemic in Canada. The Toronto event, Drag Ball presented by Crave, was streamed on June 27, and the Montreal event, Drag Superstars, was streamed on August 14. The Toronto special was directly produced by Crave; the Montreal event was produced by a separate company, but received some production assistance and sponsorship from Crave and the Canada's Drag Race production team.

Controversy
During the series run, producers and competing queens spoke out against online bullying, after Bowyer-Chapman and some of the competing queens were subjected to campaigns of harassment on social media. Bowyer-Chapman's critics focused on purportedly unfair comments in his role as a judge, while several queens were attacked for simply having done better in challenges or lipsyncs than other more popular queens with bigger fanbases.

In the second season, the show's use of KAPRI's cover of Alexis Jordan's 2010 single "Happiness" as a lip sync number faced some discussion among fans as KAPRI's recording was unlocatable on any music store or streaming platform. The situation led to unconfirmed speculation that the show had in fact directly commissioned a new cover of the song after using Jordan's original recording during production but then running into a copyright clearance issue.

Canada's Drag Race Live at the Drive-In
Following the conclusion of the season, the cast announced a cross-Canada tour, to be performed at drive-in venues due to the ongoing social distancing restrictions remaining in place during the COVID-19 pandemic. Brooke Lynn Hytes hosted, with Priyanka, Scarlett Bobo and Rita Baga were scheduled to appear at every date on the tour, while other cast members would perform at selected dates based on availability; ultimately, however, both Priyanka and Brooke Lynn Hytes had to miss a couple of later dates after being forced to self-isolate due to COVID-19 exposure.

Priyanka, Scarlett Bobo, Rita Baga and Jimbo also participated in an online panel as part of the 2020 Just for Laughs festival.

The second season queens are also slated to undertake their own group tour in 2022.

Discography

Reception
In its December 2020 year in review, the Canadian film and television industry magazine Playback named Canada's Drag Race the Unscripted Series of the Year. The show was the highest-rated original production in Crave's history.

Awards

References

External links
 

2020 Canadian television series debuts
2020s Canadian LGBT-related television series
2020s Canadian reality television series
2020s LGBT-related reality television series
 
Canadian television series based on American television series
Crave original programming
Television series by Blue Ant Studios
WOW Presents Plus original programming
Gemini and Canadian Screen Award for Best Reality Series winners
Canadian LGBT-related reality television series